Vincent Charles Arthur Giardelli, MBE, (11 April 1911 – 2 November 2009) was a Welsh artist of Italian paternal descent.

Giardelli's work is held in many collections including the Tate, the National Museum of Wales, the National Library of Wales, Contemporary Art Society of Wales, Arts Council of Wales, Museum of Modern Art Wales, Brecknock Museum, Tenby Museum and Art Gallery together with museums and galleries in New York City, Dublin, Nantes, Bratislava and Prague.

Life
Giardelli was raised in Surrey and attended Hertford College, Oxford, where he did a degree in Modern Languages. He later trained at the Ruskin School of Art, Oxford, 1930–34. He lived most of his life in Wales and was represented by the Grosvenor Gallery in London for a large part of his career. He was a friend of artists Cedric Morris, David Jones, Josef Herman and Ceri Richards. He also had international artist friends including Zoran Mušič, Olivier Debré and Fairfield Porter. He was pro-active in bringing art into south Wales' communities: In the Second World War, Harvey Grammar School, Folkestone, where he taught, being evacuated, he became part of the Dowlais Educational Settlement Movement, and was influential in setting up the Rhondda Group. A Christian pacifist, influenced by Gandhi, he registered as a conscientious objector, leading to his dismissal as a teacher, even though he worked part-time in the National Fire Service. In 1948 Arthur Giardelli was one of the founders of the South Wales Group (which later became The Welsh Group) and the 56 Group Wales, of which he became president towards the end of his life. He was also on the committee of the Contemporary Art Society for Wales and on the Welsh Arts Council.
He helped found the University Art Collection at Aberystwyth.

Art
Giardelli first began to take his art seriously in the 1940s, when he arrived in Merthyr Tydfil, where he first met Cedric Morris and Heinz Koppel who both encouraged him. The town had an immediate impact on Giardelli; he once told poet Meic Stephens that "when the train finally pulled into Merthyr, I felt I'd come home".

Giardelli felt he had to constantly draw, paint and create and feared a world where his creative practice wasn't part of his life. He said "If I don't paint for a month, I may give it up for ever, so the constant challenge is that you must keep working. You must paint. You must draw. It's like speaking".

Giardelli used watercolours and found materials, including shells and driftwood. He was perhaps best known for his abstract relief constructions inspired by nature and the seasons. Conversely he was also inspired by Modernist artists including Piet Mondrian.

Awards
1970: the Visual Art prize at the National Eisteddfod of Wales
1973: was made an MBE
1979: British Council Award winner
1979–85: Honorary Fellow at University College Aberystwyth
1986: Silver Medal of the Czechoslovak Society for International Relations 
2002 Cyfaill Celfyddyd Cymru (Friend of Welsh Art) medal from the National Eisteddfod of Wales.

Publications
 Arthur Giardelli: Paintings, Constructions, Relief Sculptures – Conversations with Derek Shiel, Seren, Bridgend 2001.

References

External links 
 

1911 births
2009 deaths
20th-century English painters
English male painters
21st-century English painters
21st-century English male artists
20th-century Welsh painters
21st-century Welsh painters
21st-century Welsh male artists
Welsh male painters
British conscientious objectors
English people of Italian descent
Members of The Welsh Group
Members of the Order of the British Empire
Modern painters
Members of the 56 Group Wales
Painters from London
People from Surrey
People from Merthyr Tydfil
People from Aberystwyth
Welsh people of Italian descent
20th-century English male artists
20th-century Welsh male artists
Alumni of Hertford College, Oxford